Lake Tomahawk is an unincorporated community and census-designated place in central Middleton Township, Columbiana County, Ohio, United States, surrounding the Lake Tomahawk reservoir. The population was 494 at the 2020 census. Lake Tomahawk was established in 1966 by the American Realty Service Corporation as a private planned community.

Reservoir
It is a man-made, spring-fed lake, home to a variety of stocked fish. There is a  beach with a picnic pavilion, a children's playground, and lighted tennis, volleyball and basketball courts. The community has a driving range and archery range. There are six docking areas with a total of 26 slips and a marina with a boat launching ramp and gasoline pump.

Geography
Lake Tomahawk is located at  (40.761389, -80.596389).

Climate
Lake Tomahawk has four distinct seasons, with precipitation somewhat evenly spread throughout the year. Extreme temperature variations occur during the winter only. Tomahawk usually has its wettest month during May and its warmest temperatures in late July and August.
	            	                        

Lake Tomahawk gets on average  of rain per year. The number of days with any measurable precipitation is 130.

On average, there are 162 sunny days per year in Lake Tomahawk. The comfort index, which is based on humidity during the hot months, is a 49 out of 100, where higher is more comfortable. The US average on the comfort index is 44.

Demographics

2020 Census

Government
Lake Tomahawk is governed by a property owners association. Lake Tomahawk has a nine-member board, with three members elected every year. The board's responsibilities include the management of the lake, roads, marina, beach, treasury, security, legal, conservation and lake activities. Lake Tomahawk has its own private security force which patrols the lake and its grounds while enforcing lake regulations.

Education
Children in Lake Tomahawk are served by the Beaver Local School District. The current schools serving Lake Tomahawk are:
 Beaver Local Elementary School –  grades K-4
 Beaver Local Middle School – grades 5-8
 Beaver Local High School – grades 9-12

References

Census-designated places in Columbiana County, Ohio
Census-designated places in Ohio